The 1968 Clemson Tigers football team was an American football team that represented Clemson University in the Atlantic Coast Conference (ACC) during the 1968 NCAA University Division football season. In its 29th season under head coach Frank Howard, the team compiled a 4–5–1 record (4–1–1 against conference opponents), finished second in the ACC, and outscored opponents by a total of 184 to 179. The team played its home games at Memorial Stadium in Clemson, South Carolina.

Quarterback Billy Ammons and defensive end Ronnie Duckworth were the team captains. The team's statistical leaders included Ammons with 1,006 passing yards, Buddy Gore with 776 rushing yards, Charlie Waters with 411 receiving yards, and Ray Yauger with 42 points scored (7 touchdowns).

Five Clemson players were selected by the Associated Press as first-team players on the 1968 All-Atlantic Coast Conference football team: back Buddy Gore; offensive tackle Joe Lhotsky; defensive end Ronnie Duckworth; defensive tackle John Cagle; and linebacker Jimmy Catoe.

Schedule

Roster

References

Clemson
Clemson Tigers football seasons
Clemson Tigers football